The 2010 WNBA season is the 13th season for the Washington Mystics of the Women's National Basketball Association. This season was the first that the Mystics won 20 games and had home court advantage to open a playoff series. They would not have home court again until the 2017 First Round. This was also the best regular-season record in franchise history.

Transactions

Dispersal draft
Based on the Mystics' 2009 record, they would pick 6th in the Sacramento Monarchs dispersal draft. The Mystics picked Kristin Haynie.

WNBA Draft
The following are the Mystics' selections in the 2010 WNBA Draft.

Transaction log
January 30, 2009: The Mystics received the second round pick in the 2010 draft from the Minnesota Lynx as part of the Lindsey Harding transaction.
February 17: The Mystics re-signed free agent Monique Currie and signed La'Tangela Atkinson to a training camp contract..
February 25: The Mystics signed Lauren Ervin to a training camp contract.
March 16: The Mystics signed Katie Smith and Kristin Haynie.
March 30: The Mystics signed Carla Thomas to a training camp contract.
April 7: The Mystics signed Kristen Mann to a training camp contract.
April 19: The Mystics re-signed Nikki Blue.
April 23: The Mystics signed Ewelina Kobryn and LeLe Hardy to training camp contracts.
April 28: The Mystics waived LeLe Hardy.
April 30: The Mystics signed Jennifer Lacy and waived Alysha Harvin and Jenna Smith.
May 6: The Mystics waived Alexis Gray-Lawson and Lauren Ervin.
May 12: The Mystics traded Nikki Blue to the New York Liberty in exchange for Ashley Houts.
May 13: The Mystics waived Shanavia Dowdell and suspended Kristin Haynie for the 2010 season.
May 14: The Mystics waived La'Tangela Atkinson, Ewilina Korbyn, Jennifer Lacy, Kristen Mann and Carla Thomas.

Trades

Free agents

Additions

Subtractions

Roster

Depth

Season standings

Schedule

Preseason

|- align="center" bgcolor="bbffbb"
| 1 || May 5 || 11:30am || New York || 65-60 || Coleman (15) || Sanford (8) || Smith (3) || Verizon Center  7,152 || 1-0
|- align="center" bgcolor="bbffbb"
| 2 || May 9 || 2:00pm || @ Atlanta || 77-58 || Currie (16) || Atkinson, Langhorne (8) || Harding, Smith (3) || Eblen Center  2,219 || 2-0
|-

Regular season

|- align="center" bgcolor="bbffbb"
| 1 || May 15 || 7:00pm || @ Indiana ||  || 72-65 || Currie (21) || Langhorne (8) || Harding (3) || Conseco Fieldhouse  9,752 || 1-0
|- align="center" bgcolor="bbffbb"
| 2 || May 16 || 7:00pm || @ Minnesota || FS-N || 87-76 || Currie (27) || Langhorne, Melvin (9) || Harding (4) || Target Center  9,985 || 2-0
|- align="center" bgcolor="bbffbb"
| 3 || May 21 || 7:00pm || New York ||  || 77-61 || Harding (21) || Langhorne (11) || Smith (4) || Verizon Center  10,158 || 3-0
|- align="center" bgcolor="ffbbbb"
| 4 || May 23 || 3:00pm || @ Connecticut ||  || 65-80 || Langhorne (16) || Langhorne (8) || Harding (5) || Mohegan Sun Arena  7,614 || 3-1
|- align="center" bgcolor="ffbbbb"
| 5 || May 25 || 10:00pm || @ Seattle ||  || 76-82 || Currie (24) || Sanford (6) || Harding (4) || KeyArena  6,612 || 3-2
|- align="center" bgcolor="ffbbbb"
| 6 || May 28 || 10:30pm || @ Los Angeles || PRIME || 75-81 || Smith (15) || Langhorne (10) || Harding (8) || STAPLES Center  13,154 || 3-3
|- align="center" bgcolor="bbffbb"
| 7 || May 30 || 4:00pm || Connecticut ||  || 69-65 || Currie (18) || Langhorne (16) || Harding (9) || Verizon Center  8,602 || 4-3
|-

|- align="center" bgcolor="ffbbbb"
| 8 || June 5 || 7:00pm || Atlanta ||  || 79-86 (OT) || Langhorne (23) || Langhorne, Melvin (8) || Ajavon, Harding (4) || Verizon Center  8,986 || 4-4
|- align="center" bgcolor="bbffbb"
| 9 || June 11 || 8:30pm || @ Chicago || CN100 || 95-78 || Harding (25) ||Currie, Langhorne (8)  || Currie, Harding (5)  || Allstate Arena  3,107  || 5-4
|- align="center" bgcolor="bbffbb"
| 10 || June 12 || 7:00pm || New York || CSN-MA || 82-65 || Currie (20) || Langhorne (9) || Currie (4) || Verizon Center  8,492 || 6-4
|- align="center" bgcolor="bbffbb"
| 11 || June 19 || 7:00pm || Chicago || NBATVCSN-MACN100 || 65-61 (OT) || Smith (17) || Langhorne (10) || Harding (6) || Verizon Center  9,034 || 7-4
|- align="center" bgcolor="bbffbb"
| 12 || June 24 || 7:00pm || Los Angeles || CSN-MA || 68-53 || Langhorne (27) || Langhorne (14) || Harding (4) || Verizon Center  8,160 || 8-4
|- align="center" bgcolor="ffbbbb"
| 13 || June 25 || 8:30pm || @ Chicago || CN100 || 72-79 || Langhorne (25) || Langhorne (13) || Currie (4) || Allstate Arena  3,419 || 8-5
|- align="center" bgcolor="bbffbb"
| 14 || June 27 || 4:00pm || Phoenix || NBATVCSN-MA || 95-85 || Langhorne (31) || Langhorne (10) || Smith (6) || Verizon Center  7,547 || 9-5
|- align="center" bgcolor="bbffbb"
| 15 || June 29 || 7:00pm || Indiana || ESPN2 || 68-65 || Smith (21) || Langhorne (10) || Ajavon, Harding, Sanford (4) || Verizon Center  8,464 || 10-5
|-

|- align="center" bgcolor="bbffbb"
| 16 || July 1 || 10:00pm || @ Phoenix || FS-A || 107-104 || Smith (25) || Langhorne (9) || Harding (6) || US Airways Center  5,509 || 11-5
|- align="center" bgcolor="bbffbb"
| 17 || July 3 || 8:00pm || @ Tulsa || COX || 69-54 || Currie (17) || Coleman (10) || Coleman, Harding, Smith (4) || BOK Center  3,516 || 12-5
|- align="center" bgcolor="ffbbbb"
| 18 || July 15 || 12:00pm || @ New York ||  || 67-75 || Langhorne (19) || Langhorne (10) || Harding (4) || Madison Square Garden  18,162 || 12-6
|- align="center" bgcolor="ffbbbb"
| 19 || July 18 || 4:00pm || Chicago || CSN-MA || 59-61 || Langhorne (12) || Langhorne (9) || Harding (6) || Verizon Center  8,790 || 12-7
|- align="center" bgcolor="bbffbb"
| 20 || July 21 || 11:30am || Atlanta || NBATVCSN-MA || 82-72 || Langhorne (24) || Langhorne (15) || Smith (5) || Verizon Center  14,347 || 13-7
|- align="center" bgcolor="ffbbbb"
| 21 || July 24 || 7:00pm || Indiana || NBATVCSN-MA || 73-78 || Smith (17) || Langhorne (13) || Harding (3) || Verizon Center  9,786 || 13-8
|- align="center" bgcolor="ffbbbb"
| 22 || July 27 || 7:30pm || @ Connecticut ||  || 78-88 || Langhorne (23) || Currie (9) || Coleman, Melvin, Smith (3) || Mohegan Sun Arena  6,322 || 13-9
|- align="center" bgcolor="ffbbbb"
| 23 || July 29 || 7:00pm || San Antonio || NBATVCSN-MA || 75-79 || Currie (22) || Langhorne (9) || Harding (5) || Verizon Center  9,212 || 13-10
|- align="center" bgcolor="bbffbb"
| 24 || July 30 || 7:00pm || @ Indiana ||  || 77-73 || Harding (33) || Langhorne (11) || Sanford, Smith (4) || Conseco Fieldhouse  8,207 || 14-10
|-

|- align="center" bgcolor="bbffbb"
| 25 || August 1 || 4:00pm || Tulsa || NBATVCSN-MA || 87-62 || Currie, Smith (15) || Coleman (10) || Coleman, Harding (4) || Verizon Center  9,008 || 15-10
|- align="center" bgcolor="bbffbb"
| 26 || August 3 || 7:30pm || @ Atlanta || ESPN2 || 86-78 || Smith (18) || Langhorne (12) || Harding (6) || Philips Arena  9,072 || 16-10
|- align="center" bgcolor="ffbbbb"
| 27 || August 6 || 7:30pm || @ New York ||  || 77-85 || Currie (23) || Currie, Melvin (6) || Ajavon, Coleman, Smith (2) || Madison Square Garden  11,465 || 16-11
|- align="center" bgcolor="ffbbbb"
| 28 || August 8 || 5:00pm || @ Connecticut ||  || 67-76 || Langhorne (14) || Langhorne (7) || Harding (3) || Mohegan Sun Arena  7,076 || 16-12
|- align="center" bgcolor="bbffbb"
| 29 || August 10 || 7:00pm || Connecticut || NBATVCSN-MA || 84-74 || Langhorne (23) || Langhorne (10) || Harding (6) || Verizon Center  8,180 || 17-12
|- align="center" bgcolor="bbffbb"
| 30 || August 13 || 7:00pm || Minnesota ||  || 61-58 || Harding (15) || Langhorne (14) || Smith (4) || Verizon Center  7,752 || 18-12
|- align="center" bgcolor="bbffbb"
| 31 || August 15 || 4:00pm || Seattle ||  || 80-71 || Currie (25) || Langhorne (7) || 4 players (3) || Verizon Center  9,438 || 19-12
|- align="center" bgcolor="bbffbb"
| 32 || August 17 || 8:00pm || @ San Antonio ||  || 76-66 || Langhorne (21) || Langhorne (12) || Smith (6) || AT&T Center  6,801 || 20-12
|- align="center" bgcolor="bbffbb"
| 33 || August 20 || 7:00pm || New York ||  || 75-74 || Ajavon (16) || Langhorne (7) || Coleman, Harding (2) || Verizon Center  13,109 || 21-12
|- align="center" bgcolor="bbffbb"
| 34 || August 22 || 3:00pm || @ Atlanta || SSO || 90-81 || Currie (20) || Langhorne (11) || Harding (8) || Philips Arena  9,570 || 22-12
|-

| All games are viewable on WNBA LiveAccess

Postseason

|- align="center" bgcolor="ffbbbb"
| 1 || August 25 || 7:00pm || Atlanta || NBATV || 90-95 || Coleman (18) || Currie (11) || Harding (5) || Verizon Center  10,322 || 0-1
|- align="center" bgcolor="ffbbbb"
| 2 || August 27 || 7:30pm || @ Atlanta || NBATVFSSO || 77-101 || Ajavon (20) || Currie, Langhorne (7) || Ajavon (3) || Philips Arena  7,890 || 0-2 
|-

Statistics

Regular season

Postseason

Awards and honors
Crystal Langhorne was named WNBA Eastern Conference Player of the Week for the week of June 19, 2010.
Crystal Langhorne was named WNBA Eastern Conference Player of the Month for June.
Monique Currie was named to the 2010 WNBA All-Star Team as a WNBA starter.
Lindsey Harding was named to the 2010 WNBA All-Star Team as a WNBA starter.
Crystal Langhorne was named to the 2010 WNBA All-Star Team as a WNBA starter.
Lindsey Harding was named to the All-Defensive Second Team.
Crystal Langhorne was named to the All-WNBA Second Team.

References

External links

Washington Mystics seasons
Washington
Washington Mystics